Greg Bullock is a Canadian retired ice hockey center who was a two-time All-American for Massachusetts–Lowell.

Career
Bullock began attending the University of Massachusetts Lowell in 1993 and immediately made an impact with the ice hockey team. Bullock led the Chiefs in scoring, helped the team post a Division I program record with 25 wins and was named Hockey East Rookie of the Year. Lowell reached the conference championship game for the first time and won its first game in the NCAA tournament since promotion to the top level. Bullock continued his high production as a sophomore, earning a spot on the All-American first team, but the results weren't there for the newly rechristened River Hawks. Lowell finished with a losing record and then suffered a greater loss when Bullock signed a professional contract after the year, ending his college career.

He debuted for the San Francisco Spiders the following year, putting up decent numbers as a rookie. The following year Bullock was nearly a point per game player for the St. John's Maple Leafs over the course of the entire season, but was unable to earn a callup to the parent club, Toronto Maple Leafs. After splitting his third pro season between two AAA clubs, Bullock headed to Europe for a time.

He returned after a stellar, though brief, performance with HC Fassa, but then bounced around between three teams before travelling to England. Bullock's globetrotting continued for several years but by 2004 he arrived in North America for good. Even then, however, he found himself on a new team every year until 2008 when he seemed to find a home with the Flint Generals. After being named team MVP and an alternate captain, Bullock's team got off to a horrendous start in 2009. Just 22 games into the season, Bullock was released from his contract and his professional career came to a close.

The next season he was back on the ice, however, this time playing for the Brantford Blast, a senior team near his hometown. He spent four years with the team, helping them win back-to-back J. Ross Robertson Cups before hanging up his skates in 2014.

Statistics

Regular season and playoffs

Awards and honors

References

External links

1973 births
Living people
AHCA Division I men's ice hockey All-Americans
Canadian ice hockey centres
Ice hockey people from Ontario
People from Cambridge, Ontario
UMass Lowell River Hawks men's ice hockey players
San Francisco Spiders players
St. John's Maple Leafs players
Grand Rapids Griffins players
Augsburger Panther players
SHC Fassa players
Lowell Lock Monsters players
Kansas City Blades players
Kalamazoo Wings (1974–2000) players
Manchester Storm (1995–2002) players
Bolzano HC players
Idaho Steelheads (WCHL) players
Straubing Tigers players
Fresno Falcons players
Corpus Christi Rayz players
Motor City Mechanics players
Port Huron Flags players
Flint Generals players